Moondawn is the sixth album by Klaus Schulze. It was originally released in 1976, and in 2005 was the thirteenth Schulze album reissued by Revisited Records. Moondawn is Schulze's first album that was performed in a full Berlin School style.

The 2005 Revisited reissue included the bonus track "Floating Sequence", an alternate version of "Floating". A 1995 Manikin Records "Original Master" edition of Moondawn included the bonus track "Supplement" (25:22), which was an alternate version of "Mindphaser".

Track listing
All tracks composed by Klaus Schulze.

Personnel
 Klaus Schulze – Moog, ARP 2600, ARP Odyssey, EMS Synthi-A, Farfisa Syntorchestra, Crumar keyboards, Sequenzer Synthanorma 3-12
 Harald Grosskopf – drums

References

External links
 Moondawn at the official site of Klaus Schulze
 Moondawn: The Original Master at the official site of Klaus Schulze
 

Klaus Schulze albums
1976 albums
Brain Records albums